There were eleven boxing events at the 1976 Summer Olympics in Montreal, Quebec, Canada. The competition was held from 18 to 31 July with the participation of 266 fighters from 54 countries.

Medalists

Medal table

References

External links
 Results on Amateur Boxing

 
1976 Summer Olympics events
O
1976